Aphantaulax trifasciata is a species of ground spider in the genus Aphantaulax, family Gnaphosidae.

Subspecies
 Aphantaulax trifasciata trifasciata (O. P.-Cambridge, 1872) (Palearctic)
 Aphantaulax trifasciata trimaculata Simon, 1878 (France)

Description
The body is oblong-oval shaped, narrow and pointed at the back. The body color is black, with a broad transverse band of white hairs on the fore margin of abdomen, a second interrupted transverse band in the middle of the abdomen and a longitudinal white stripe on the cephalothorax. On the extremityof the abdomen sometimes there are two white spots. Legs are yellow-brown.

Distribution
This species is present in the Palearctic realm. It is absent from Central Europe, Britain and Scandinavia.

Habitat
These spiders can be found under rocks and leaves, mainly on sea coasts or riverbanks. They usually hunt at night.

Bibliography
 Hu, J. L. & Wu, W. G. (1989). Spiders from agricultural regions of Xinjiang Uygur Autonomous Region, China. Shandong University Publishing House, Jinan, 435 pp. 
 Kamura, T. (2009). Trochanteriidae, Gnaphosidae, Prodidomidae, Corinnidae. In: Ono, H. (ed.) The Spiders of Japan with keys to the families and genera and illustrations of the species. Tokai University Press, Kanagawa, pp. 482–500, 551-557
 Levy, G. (2002). Spiders of the genera Micaria and Aphantaulax (Araneae, Gnaphosidae) from Israel. Israel Journal of Zoology 48: 111-134. 
 Murphy, J. (2007). Gnaphosid genera of the world. British Arachnological Society, St Neots, Cambs 1, i-xii, 1-92; 2:i-11, 93-605
 Roberts, M. J. (1995). Collins Field Guide: Spiders of Britain & Northern Europe. HarperCollins, London, 383 pp.

References

External links
 Nature Photography by Dragiša Savić
 Mundo Natural Faluke Naturaleza en Almeria, Entomologia y Botanica

Gnaphosidae
Spiders of Europe
Palearctic spiders
Spiders described in 1872